= Pandesic =

Pandesic (/pænˈdɛsɪk/ pan-DESS-ik) was an Intel-SAP joint venture founded in August 1997 intended to sell software and hardware to support e-commerce. In July 2000, it was shut down after failing to find "a timely road to profitability".

The company's failings inspired a Harvard Business School case study.
